Elisa Gabbert (born 1979) is an American writer, poet and essayist. She is the author of numerous books and is currently a New York Times poetry columnist.

Biography
Gabbert attended Rice University where she studied linguistics and cognitive science. She also earned an MFA in creative writing from Emerson College. Since March 2020, Gabbert has been The New York Times poetry columnist, succeeding David Orr.

She lives in Denver, Colorado.

Work and publications
Currently, Gabbert is the author of six books, including two essay collections and four poetry collections.

Essays
As of 2021, Gabbert has published 2 collections of essays: The Word Pretty in 2018, and The Unreality of Memory in 2020.

Her debut essay collection The Word Pretty was followed by the much acclaimed collection The Unreality of Memory (2020), which engages the history of catastrophes to consider how people perceive themselves.

Poetry
Gabbert is the author of four poetry collections, including The French Exit (2011) and L'Heure Bleue, or the Judy Poems (2016); the latter imagines the perspective of Judy, one of the characters in Wallace Shawn’s play The Designated Mourner.

Gabbert’s book The Self Unstable (2013) is a hybrid collection of prose and poetry. In The New Yorker’s year-end review, Teju Cole named The Self Unstable one of the best books of 2013.

Gabbert’s book of poetry, Normal Distance, was published by Soft Skull Press in 2022.

References

External links 

 Excerpt from The Self Unstable in Boston Review, April 30, 2013
 Excerpt from L'Heure Bleue, or the Judy Poems in Pank Magazine, March/April 2015
 Excerpt from L'Heure Bleue, or the Judy Poems in the Harvard Review, October 29, 2015

Living people
1979 births
Emerson College alumni
Rice University alumni
People from Denver
American women poets
21st-century American poets
Poets from Colorado
American women essayists
21st-century American essayists
American women columnists
21st-century American women